Kuku-Thaypan is an extinct Paman language spoken on the southwestern part of the Cape York Peninsula, Queensland in Australia, by the Kuku-Thaypan people. The language was sometimes called Alaya or Awu Alaya. Koko-Rarmul may have been a dialect, though Bowern (2012) lists Gugu-Rarmul and Kuku-Thaypan as separate languages. The last native speaker, Tommy George, died on 29 July 2016 in Cooktown Hospital.

Phonology

Vowels 
Kuku-Thaypan has six vowels and two marginal vowels possibly only in loan words.

Consonants 
Kuku-Thaypan has 23 consonants.

References

External links 
 Bibliography of Kuku Thaypan people and language resources, at the Australian Institute of Aboriginal and Torres Strait Islander Studies

Thaypan languages
Extinct languages of Queensland
Languages extinct in the 2010s
2016 disestablishments in Australia